Marijan Lišnjić (1609–7 March 1686) was a Croatian prelate of the Catholic Church who served as the bishop of Makarska and apostolic administrator of Duvno from 1664 to 1686. Both of his dioceses were under the Ottoman occupation, and the population suffered from both the war between the Republic of Venice and the Ottomans and the treatment from the both, with Venetians enslaving and selling Christians to the Turks, and Ottomans oppressing their faith.

Bishop Marijan was the first to introduce secular clergy to Bosnia Eyalet after it fell to the Ottomans in the 15th century, the region were the pastoral care was given to the Franciscans.

Biography 

Marijan Lišnjić was born near Imotski, at the time part of the Ottoman Empire. He became a Franciscan monk in the local Franciscan monastery of Saint Francis in 1630. Four years later he was consecrated a priest in Zaostrog, after which he went to Italy, where he studied in Tuscany and Milan. After finishing his studies, he served in Fojnica in Bosnia for a while, and returned to Zaostrog.

After the death of Bishop of Bosnia Marijan Maravić, Lišnjić was a candidate for his succession, however, due to the opposition from Austrian Emperor and the local Franciscan clergy of Bosna Srebrena, he wasn't appointed to the office. Moreover, he spent six months in prison due to the opposition against him. Namely, the local Franciscans urged the Ottomans to imprison him.

As the bishopric of Makarska was vacant, he was named its bishop as well as an apostolic administrator of Duvno on 11 February 1664. The Diocese of Makarska was heavily inflicted by the Ottoman–Venetian war that lasted until 1669. Part of the population fled to the neighboring isles of Brač and Hvar, while those that remained were maltreated by Uskoks, the irregular soldiers, who haven't differentiated the Christians from invading Turks. Before the war, the Diocese of Makarska had around 15 thousand people, and after the war only 5 thousand have remained, and all of them poor. His work was also burdened because he needed to pay the local pasha and various Ottoman officials in order to act freely.

The believers in the parish of Mostar, that belonged to the Diocese of Makarska, weren't allowed to have masses and were molested by the Turks. In 1670, Bishop Marijan served a mass in Mostar only to be arrested by the Ottomans and to be threatened to convert to Islam. He was ransomed by the local Catholics. Another problem for Bishop Marijan was enslavement of Christians by the Venetians. In 1665 he wrote a letter to the Pope, complaining that the Venetians are selling Christians to the Turks as slaves. Lišnjić claimed that some 7 thousand Christians from his diocese were sold to slavery by the Venetians.

Both dioceses, Makarska and Duvno, lacked priests. West Herzegovina, under the jurisdiction of the dioceses Makarska and Duvno, didn't have enough priests, and all of them were Franciscans. Bishop Marijan intended to change this by appointing secular clergy in some parishes. Fr Mijo Grbavac, a secular priest appointed by Lišnjić, was a first secular priest to serve in Bosnia Eyalet after it fell to the Ottomans in the 15th century. The local Franciscans opposed these appointments.

Bishop Marijan died in 1686 and is buried in a Franciscan church in Makarska.

Footnotes

References

Books

Journals 

 

1609 births
1686 deaths
People from Imotski
Bishops of Duvno
Bishops appointed by Pope Alexander VII
Bosnia and Herzegovina Roman Catholic bishops
17th-century Roman Catholic bishops in Croatia